Bekithemba Mpofu (born 16 November 1973) is a real estate investment professional, Academic, and Zimbabwean politician. He is currently a Member of Senate for Matabeleland South Province in the Zimbabwean Parliament. Bekithemba is the inaugural secretary general for the Movement for Democratic Change Youth Assembly and has also served as the MDC Alliance's deputy spokesperson. In May 2019, he was nominated for the party national chairmanship during the congress.

References 

Movement for Democratic Change politicians
Members of the Senate of Zimbabwe
1973 births
Zimbabwean politicians
People from Matabeleland South Province
Living people